The Choral Synagogue (Синагога (Смоленск)) was a former synagogue in Smolensk in Russia. Today the building is used as a vocational school. There are now in Smolensk two synagogues and five Chadarim.

History

There were the first Jews in Smolensk in the 15th century, when Prince Vytautas of Lithuania got Smolensk in 1404 and granted it the Magdeburg rights and other privileges. 1728 the Jewish businessmen have acquired the right to come in Smolensk on trading affairs. 4,600 Jews - 10% of the total population, were mentioned in Smolensk in the 19th century. Though Smolensk was not included into the Pale of Settlement, in the 18th and 19th centuries the number of Jews in the city gradually increased and in 1896 had reached 4651 persons (about ten percent of the city's population).

Jews traded in wood, flax and grain and were engaged in financial activities.
In the beginning of the 20th century in Smolensk there were two synagogues and five chadarim and a Jewish initial school created on the basis of the Talmud. The society of the help to the poor Jews was founded in 1898.

In 1910, the Jews of Smolensk were victims of a bloody pogrom; in city there were rabble-rousing conditions.

In the 1st World War in Smolensk there has arrived the big number of the Jews run or moved from a front strip, in particular, from Latvia.

After an establishment in Smolensk under the Soviet authority (November, 1917) a gradual liquidation of the Jewish establishments began. In 1922 the Choral synagogue was confiscated by the Soviet authorities.

The next years number of the Jewish population of city continued to grow and to 1926 has reached 12 887 person (16,2% of all population).

The Jewish pedagogical school working under the aegis of Yevsektsiya was moved from Gomel to Smolensk in 1929.  13,000 Jews - 8% of the total population were in Smolensk before the beginning of the war.

In days of fights for Smolensk many Jews were lost, the part ran from city. After Smolensk was occupied, the Nazis created a ghetto in suburb Sadki and drove there about two thousand the Jews remaining in the city and its vicinity. By December, 1941 all of them have been destroyed. According to population censuses, in 1959 in Smolensk there lived 3929 Jews, in 1970–3662, in 1979–3223, in 1989–2645. There were no synagogues in the city during the post-war period. Number of the Jewish population of Smolensk area in 1959 has made 5991 person, in 1970–5316 person, in 1979–4451 person, in 1989–3536 person. Today the former Choral Synagogue is used as a vocational School.

References

External links
Smolensk

Synagogues in Russia
Buildings and structures in Smolensk Oblast
Moorish Revival synagogues
Moorish Revival architecture in Russia
Former synagogues
Culture of Smolensk Oblast